Michael Schiffner (born 13 July 1949) is a German former cyclist. He competed for East Germany in the team time trial event at the 1976 Summer Olympics.

References

External links
 

1949 births
Living people
East German male cyclists
Olympic cyclists of East Germany
Cyclists at the 1976 Summer Olympics
Sportspeople from Leipzig
People from Bezirk Leipzig
Cyclists from Saxony